Notocomplana lapunda  is a flatworm. This worm is a hermaphrodite which lives in salt water. The scientific name of the species was first published by Marcus & Marcus in 1968.

References
 Tyler, S. (2010). Notocomplana lapunda Marcus & Marcus, 1968. Based on information from the World Register of Marine Species, found at http://www.marinespecies.org/aphia.php?p=taxdetails&id=483510

Rhabditophora